Cornelio Da Montalcino was a Franciscan friar who had embraced Judaism, and was burned alive on the Campo dei Fiori in Rome, Italy, in 1554.

References

People executed by the Roman Inquisition
16th-century converts to Judaism
Jewish martyrs
1554 deaths
Year of birth unknown
Executed Italian people
People executed by the Papal States by burning
Victims of antisemitic violence
20th-century Italian Jews